Mount Danglay is a hill in the southern part of Samar Island of the Philippines. It is located in San Pedro in Santa Rita and May-it in Basey. Its terrain is estimated to be 38 meters or 125 feet above sea level.

References

Landforms of Samar (province)